Flexing may refer to:

 Flexion, the bending of a joint
 Flexing (dance), a street dance that originated in Brooklyn, New York
 Muscle contraction, activation of muscles causing shortening and bulging
Slang term for bragging about having wealth, typically used in Mumble Rap

See also
Flex (disambiguation)
Bending (disambiguation)